Ilya Zhdanov (born 21 September 1990) is a Russian male badminton player.

Achievements

BWF International Challenge/Series
Men's Doubles

Mixed Doubles

 BWF International Challenge tournament
 BWF International Series tournament
 BWF Future Series tournament

References

External links 

1990 births
Living people
Russian male badminton players